Josiah Towyn Jones (28 December 1858 – 16 November 1925) was a Welsh clergyman and Liberal Party politician.  He was Member of Parliament (MP) for Carmarthenshire East and later for Llanelli.

He was born in New Quay, Cardiganshire, and began work as a farm labourer aged 11. A year later he went to sea as a cabin boy, later working as a ship's cook and steward.

In 1876 he entered the Presbyterian College, Carmarthen. In 1880 he became a Congregationalist minister at Dowlais near Merthyr Tydfil. In 1884 he began a 22-year spell as minister at Cwmamman in the Amman Valley, Carmarthenshire. At this time he was a close political associate of leading Welsh Liberals Tom Ellis and David Lloyd George.

He married Mary Howells of Plas Cadwgan in the Swansea Valley in 1885 and they had two daughters.

In the late 1880s he emerged as a critic of local Liberal MP David Pugh. For twenty years he acted as agent for Abel Thomas, Liberal MP for Carmarthenshire East. When Thomas died in 1912, Towyn Jones replaced him at the ensuing by-election. Under the Representation of the People Act 1918 the East Carmarthenshire seat was abolished, and he was instead elected as MP for the new seat of Llanelli at the general election of that year, retiring at the 1922 election.

During World War I, he opposed conscription, but nevertheless took office in the coalition government, becoming a Whip and Junior Lord of the Treasury. When the Welsh Guards were formed during the war he enthusiastically helped in recruiting for the new regiment.

References

Welsh Biography Online

External links 

1858 births
1925 deaths
Liberal Party (UK) MPs for Welsh constituencies
Welsh Congregationalist ministers
UK MPs 1910–1918
UK MPs 1918–1922
Members of the Parliament of the United Kingdom for Carmarthenshire constituencies
People from Cardigan, Ceredigion